Natalia Germanovna Avdeeva (born 6 September 1988) is a Russian compound archer. She won gold at the 2019 World Archery Championships and shortly thereafter a gold medal with Anton Bulaev at the 2019 European Games.

References

External links
 

Russian female archers
1988 births
Living people
People from Kaliningrad
Archers at the 2019 European Games
World Archery Championships medalists
European Games medalists in archery
European Games gold medalists for Russia
European Games silver medalists for Russia
Universiade medalists in archery
Universiade gold medalists for Russia
Universiade silver medalists for Russia
Medalists at the 2009 Summer Universiade
Medalists at the 2011 Summer Universiade
Medalists at the 2015 Summer Universiade